Lyces striata is a moth of the family Notodontidae first described by Herbert Druce in 1885.

External links
Species page at Tree of Life Web Project

Notodontidae
Moths described in 1885